"Miracles" is a song written by Roger Cook, and recorded by American country music artist Don Williams.  It was released in July 1981 as the first single from the album Especially for You.  The song reached number 4 on the Billboard Hot Country Singles & Tracke chart.

Critical reception
A review in Record World was favorable, stating that "Deep, warm and sincere, his vocal makes this ballad a multi-format winner."

Chart performance

References

1981 singles
1981 songs
Don Williams songs
Songs written by Roger Cook (songwriter)
Song recordings produced by Garth Fundis
MCA Records singles